The 2021 Portland State Vikings football team represented Portland State University as a member of the Big Sky Conference during the 2021 NCAA Division I FCS football season. Led by sixth-year head coach Bruce Barnum, they played their home games at Hillsboro Stadium in Portland, Oregon.

Previous season

The Vikings played only one game, opting out of their conference schedule, losing to Montana, 48–7.

Preseason

Polls
On July 26, 2021, during the virtual Big Sky Kickoff, the Vikings were predicted to finish tenth in the Big Sky by both the coaches and media.

Preseason All–Big Sky team
The Vikings had one player selected to the preseason all-Big Sky team.

Defense

Anthony Adams – S

Schedule

Roster

Game summaries

at Hawaii

at Washington State

Western Oregon

No. 13 Montana State

at Southern Utah

at Idaho

Idaho State

Cal Poly

at No. 24 Weber State

at No. 12 Sacramento State

No 5. Eastern Washington

References

Portland
Portland State Vikings football seasons
2021 in sports in Oregon
2021 in Portland, Oregon
Sports in Hillsboro, Oregon